This is a list of colleges and universities in Arkansas. This list also includes other educational institutions providing higher education, meaning tertiary, quaternary, and, in some cases, post-secondary education.

Institutions

Out-of-state institutions
 Bryan University
 Eastern College of Health Vocations
 Heritage College & Heritage Institute
 ITT Technical Institute
 Park University, Little Rock Air Force Base
 Remington College
 Southern Illinois University, Little Rock Air Force Base
 Strayer University
 University of Phoenix
 Webster University, Little Rock
Webster University, Northwest Arkansas

Defunct institutions
Judsonia University, Judsonia, Arkansas
Little Rock Commercial College and Telegraph Institute
Little Rock College
St. Johns' College (Little Rock)  
Southeast College of Technology (now Remington College)

See also

 List of college athletic programs in Arkansas
 Higher education in the United States
 List of American institutions of higher education
 List of recognized higher education accreditation organizations
List of colleges and universities
List of colleges and universities by country

Notes

External links
Department of Education listing of accredited institutions in Arkansas

Arkansas, List of colleges and universities in
 
Colleges and universities